Treat Huey and Dominic Inglot were the defending champions but they decided not to participate.
Jamie Murray and John Peers defeated Ken and Neal Skupski 6–2, 6–7(3–7), [10–6] in the final to win the title.

Seeds

Draw

Draw

References
 Main Draw
 Qualifying Draw

Aegon Trophyandnbsp;- Doubles
2013 Men's Doubles